NoCut News is a daily newspaper run by South Korea's Christian Broadcasting System (기독교방송). Since November 2003, they have had a partnership with Central and Local News Media Networks(Over 30) for sharing of articles and photo content. In March 2006, they began printing a separate edition for North America, in competition with the Christian Times.

See also
 Christian Broadcasting System

References

External links

Newspapers published in South Korea
Korean-language newspapers